The 1983 Bucknell Bison football team was an American football team that represented Bucknell University as an independent during the 1983 NCAA Division I-AA football season.

In their ninth year under head coach Bob Curtis, the Bison compiled a 4–5–1 record. Ron Clark, Brad Henneman and Shane Snyder were the team captains.

Bucknell played its home games at Memorial Stadium on the university campus in Lewisburg, Pennsylvania.

Schedule

References

Bucknell
Bucknell Bison football seasons
Bucknell Bison football